Follow the Flock, Step in Shit is the second studio recording by The Locust. The EP consists of the two tracks that appeared on the split 5" picture disc with Jenny Piccolo, as well as the track "Red" from the Cry Now, Cry Later Vol. 4 compilation album. The EP came on a 3" square CD.

Track listing
 "Follow the Flock, Step in Shit" – 1:29
 "Coffin Nails" – 0:29
 "Red" – 1:09

References

2003 EPs
The Locust albums